Rasony District is a district in Vitebsk Region, Belarus.

Nescherdo Lake, the seventh largest lake in Belarus, is situated in this district.

Notable residents 

 Jan Barszczewski (1797, Mirahi village – 1851) - "one of the founders of modern Belarusian literature"
 Hienadz Buraǔkin (1936, Šulacina village – 2014) - Belarusian poet, journalist and diplomat

World War II 
During World War II, Rasony District was a large part of the Belarusian partisans. Led by Pyotr Masherov, the partisan movement in Rasony began in 1941, and continued until Operation Bagration liberated Belarus from Nazi Germany in 1944.

References

Districts of Vitebsk Region